Les Suprêmes (The Supremes) is the senior-level synchronized skating team representing the figure skating club Club de Patinage Artistique de Saint-Léonard (CPA St-Léonard) in Montréal, Quebec, Canada. CPA St-Léonard fields teams, all named Les Suprêmes, at six levels: pre-juvenile, juvenile, novice, open, junior and senior.

Competitive results

Competitive results (2000–2010)

Competitive results (2010–2017)

References

External links
Official website of Les Suprêmes

Supremes, Les
Sports teams in Quebec
World Synchronized Skating Championships medalists